Leptasterias aequalis, common names little six-rayed seastar or six-armed star, is a species of starfish.

The coloration is extremely variable.

This seastar is found in the eastern Pacific Ocean, from Washington to Southern California. It lives on rocky shores, in the mid-intertidal zone.

Many sea-stars broadcast-spawn their embryos, where fertilization occurs in the water column; however, Leptasterias species brood their embryos locally. The stars form mating aggregations and the female sits on her brood for a period of 6–8 weeks while the embryos develop underneath.  Eventually, the embryos fully metamorphose into juvenile sea-stars and walk away, and thus can only locally disperse. Larger females produce larger embryos of great quality; however, as larger broods are produced, a considerable proportion of them are lost.

References

External links
 Much good information at: 
 CalPhoto image 1: 
 CalPhoto image 2: 

Leptasterias
Animals described in 1862